Dean Hawkins (born 10 March 1999) is an Australian professional rugby league footballer who plays as a  and  for the South Sydney Rabbitohs in the NRL.

Background
Hawkins played his junior rugby league for the Matraville Tigers. He was educated at Champagnat Catholic College, Pagewood.

Playing career

2021
Hawkins made his first grade debut in round 5 of the 2021 NRL season for South Sydney against the Brisbane Broncos.

2022
Hawkins made only one first grade appearance for South Sydney in the 2022 NRL season which was a 26-0 victory over Parramatta in round 22 of the competition.

References

External links
Rabbitohs profile

1999 births
Living people
Australian rugby league players
Rugby league halfbacks
Rugby league players from Sydney
South Sydney Rabbitohs players